The National Rebirth Party (PAREN) is a political party in Burkina Faso.

History 
At the legislative elections, 5 May 2002, the party won 2.7% of the popular vote and 4 out of 111 seats. In the presidential election of 13 November 2005, its candidate Laurent Bado won 2.6% of the popular vote. At the 2007 parliamentary elections, the party won 1 seat.

References

1999 establishments in Burkina Faso
Communitarianism
Conservative parties in Africa
Political parties established in 1999
Political parties in Burkina Faso
Social conservative parties